Mount Sorell is a mountain located in the West Coast region of Tasmania, Australia.

History
The mountain was named in honour of William Sorell (1775 – 4 June 1848), a soldier who served as the third Lieutenant-Governor of Van Diemen's Land.

Alluvial gold was found in adjacent creeks in the 1880s.

Geology
Its eastern face dominates the Clark River, Tasmania valley, which separates it from Mount Darwin.

Because of its position, its appearance and dominance over the Macquarie Harbour just north east of Sarah Island, it was an early named mountain, and no doubt one which gave a sense of barrier to convicts with dreams of escape. Some folklore passed from convict times claim leg irons or other items were found by troops looking for escaped convicts on its slopes.

It has no points of access like the nearby mountains, and in general remains relatively untouched compared to the West Coast Range mountains with old mine workings, walking track, and other signs of human activity.

The Cape at the outer part of Hells Gates at the entrance to Macquarie Harbour is known as Cape Sorell, and there is a locality in south eastern Tasmania called Sorell.

See also

 List of highest mountains of Tasmania

References

Further reading
 
 

Sorell, Mount
Sorell, Mount
Sorell, Mount